Lázaro Blanco Matos  (born February 23, 1986) is a Cuban professional baseball pitcher who is a free agent. He previously played for the Alazanes de Granma of the Cuban National Series.

Blanco played for the Cuba national baseball team at the 2015 Pan American Games and 2017 World Baseball Classic.

Career
Blanco signed with the Québec Capitales of the Can-Am League on May 20, 2017. He re-signed with the club for the 2018 season, and was later waived prior to the 2019 season. 

Blanco signed with the Saraperos de Saltillo of the Mexican League for the 2020 season. Blanco did not play in a game in 2020 due to the cancellation of the Mexican League season because of the COVID-19 pandemic.

In 2021, Blanco pitched for the Cuba national baseball team at the 2020 Summer Olympics Americas Qualifier in Florida. Following the event, he was set to fly to Mexico to join the Saraperos de Saltillo, but missed his flight and announced that he would defect to the United States.

On November 29, 2022, while playing for the Estrellas Orientales in the Dominican Winter League, Blanco was struck in the face by a comebacker off the bat of Gigantes del Cibao hitter Henry Urrutia. Blanco suffered multiple facial fractures and was forced to miss the remainder of the season. He had posted an 0-1 record and 5.40 ERA across 5 appearances (3 of them starts).

References

External links

1986 births
Living people
Baseball pitchers
Alazanes de Granma players
Cocodrilos de Matanzas players
2017 World Baseball Classic players
Baseball players at the 2015 Pan American Games
Pan American Games bronze medalists for Cuba
Baseball players at the 2019 Pan American Games
Québec Capitales players
Pan American Games medalists in baseball
Medalists at the 2015 Pan American Games
Defecting Cuban baseball players
Defectors to the United States
People from Yara, Cuba